Snowshoe can refer to

Snowshoe, a type of footwear.
Snowshoe, Michigan, an unincorporated community
Snow Shoe, Pennsylvania, a town in Pennsylvania, United States.
Snowshoe, West Virginia, a town in West Virginia, United States.
Snowshoe Mountain, a ski resort near this town.
Snowshoe (cat), a breed of cat.
Snowshoe hare, a type of hare.
Snowshoe Thompson, the father of California skiing.
VSR SR-1 Snoshoo, an American Formula One racing aircraft